Chris Sharrock (born 30 May 1964) is an English drummer, hailing from Bebington, Cheshire (now Merseyside), England.  He has been a member of the Icicle Works, the La's, the Wild Swans, World Party, the Lightning Seeds, Robbie Williams's live band, Oasis, Beady Eye and is currently in Noel Gallagher's High Flying Birds.

Career
Sharrock's recording career began as a member of the Cherry Boys; he was the drummer on the band's first single, "Man to Man", released in January 1981. Sharrock then left the Cherry Boys for the Icicle Works, with whom he stayed until 1988, playing on the band's first four albums. He then left that band and briefly joined the La's, drumming on their hit single "There She Goes". He left the La's shortly thereafter, and drummed on the Wild Swans' second album in 1990.

Sharrock subsequently joined World Party as an official member in the mid-1990s, followed by a stint in the Lightning Seeds. In 1994, he was a member of "Terry and the Lovemen", a one-off recording project that was actually the band XTC appearing on their own tribute album under a pseudonym. Sharrock also played drums on Del Amitri's 1995 album Twisted, but was not an official member of that band. By 1998, Sharrock was the drummer in Robbie Williams' band, a position he held for the next 8 years.

Sharrock joined Oasis in 2008 after previous drummer Zak Starkey left the group. Chris did not play on the band's 2008 album, Dig Out Your Soul, but played on the subsequent tour. Noel Gallagher said in an interview for Mojo, regarding the appointment of Oasis' new drummer, "Liam is still not happy about Chris Sharrock, because he's Robbie Williams' drummer. I went home and thought about it and it was just too much of a temptation to piss Robbie Williams and Liam off in one phone call." Sharrock made his live debut with Oasis on 14 August 2008, in front of 150 Oasis fan club members.

Sharrock became well known to Oasis fans for his drum solo during the song "The Shock of the Lightning" which he performed several times whilst touring with Oasis during 2008 and 2009. As well, he was noted for his flamboyant tricks with his drumsticks, including twirling them during the intro to "Morning Glory" and throwing them up in the air now and again, much to the crowd's enjoyment.

In an interview given during the South American tour of 2009 (posted by Noel on the Official Oasis Blog), Noel Gallagher, asked to compare the drumming prowess of Chris Sharrock and Zak Starkey, stated that they are both the same. Starkey and Sharrock have an extremely similar history, very often taking over from each other; Sharrock was Starkey's predecessor as the drummer for both the Icicle Works and the Lightning Seeds.

After Oasis split in 2009, Sharrock formed Beady Eye with former bandmates Liam Gallagher, Gem Archer, and Andy Bell. He would be featured on their two studio albums Different Gear, Still Speeding and BE. When Beady Eye disbanded, Sharrock joined the touring band for Noel Gallagher's High Flying Birds, who were promoting the album Chasing Yesterday. Along with his former bandmate Archer, Sharrock was announced as a full-time member for Noel Gallagher's High Flying Birds during the 2017 recording sessions of Who Built The Moon?  Sharrock did not, however, appear on the album in any capacity.

Associated acts
 The Cherry Boys (1980–1981)
 The Icicle Works (1981–1988)
 The La's (1988–1989)
 The Wild Swans (1990)
 World Party (1990–1997)
 The Lightning Seeds (1994–1996)
 Robbie Williams (1997–2008)
 Oasis (2008–2009)
 Beady Eye (2010–2014)
 Noel Gallagher's High Flying Birds (2016–present)

Session discography

 The Icicle Works – The Icicle Works (1984)
 The Icicle Works – The Small Price of a Bicycle (1985)
 The Icicle Works – If You Want to Defeat Your Enemy Sing His Song (1987)
 The Icicle Works – Blind (1988)
 The La's – "There She Goes" (1988)
 The Wild Swans – Space Flower (1990)
 World Party – Bang! (1993) 
 Terry Hall – Home (1993)
 Del Amitri – Twisted (1995)
 Spiritualized – Pure Phase (1995) 
 The Lightning Seeds – Dizzy Heights (1996) 
 World Party – Egyptology (1997)
 Robbie Williams – Life thru a Lens (1997)
 Terry Hall – Laugh (1997)
 Robbie Williams – I've Been Expecting You (1998)
 Robbie Williams -The Ego Has Landed (1999)

 Tom Jones – Reload (1999)
 Eurythmics – Peace (1999)
 Sack Trick – (Music From) The Mystery Rabbits (1999)
 Sack Trick – Penguins on the Moon (2000)
 Mike Badger – Double Zero (2000)
 Sinéad O'Connor – Faith and Courage (2000)
 Robbie Williams – Sing When You're Winning (2000)
 Robbie Williams – United (2000)
 Robbie Williams – Live at Knebworth (2003)
 Mick Jagger & Dave Stewart – Alfie (2004)
 Robbie Williams – Greatest Hits (2004)
 Beady Eye – Different Gear, Still Speeding (2011)
 The Justice Collective – "He Ain't Heavy, He's My Brother" (2012)
 Beady Eye – BE (2013)
 Noel Gallagher's High Flying Birds –  Black Star Dancing (2019)
 Robbie Williams - XXV (2022)

Drum kit
Chris used a Premier Series kit, made especially for the last Oasis tour.

It includes (All in Chrome finish):

 24" x 14" Maple Shell Bass Drum
 14" x 10" Rack Tom
 16" x 16" Floor Tom
 14" x 5.5" Steel Shell Parallel Action Snare Drum.

His cymbal setup on the last
Beady Eye tour was composed of Zildjian cymbals;
 21" A Sweet Ride
 14" K Mastersound Hihats
 17" A Rezo Crash 
 20" A Medium Crash
In Oasis, his setup was made up of, (L-R):
 21" K Crash Ride 
 19" Avedis Custom Rezo Crash (Left side)
 14" K Mastersound Hihats
 21" Avedis Sweet Ride
 21" K Crash Ride
He uses Zildjian 5A's drumsticks and Remo drumheads.

 Remo Clear Power Stroke 3 with White Falam Patch (Bass drum)
 Remo Coated Ambassadors (Snare, Tom and Floor Tom)

References

External links
 Beady Eye official website (archived link)

1964 births
English drummers
British male drummers
Oasis (band) members
The La's members
Living people
People from Bebington
Beady Eye members
World Party members
The Icicle Works members
The Lightning Seeds members
The Wild Swans members
Robbie Williams Band members
Noel Gallagher's High Flying Birds members
New wave drummers